Lake Sautauriski is a freshwater body crossed from north to south by the Sautauriski River, flowing in the unorganized territory of Lac-Jacques-Cartier, in the La Côte-de-Beaupré Regional County Municipality, in the administrative region of Capitale-Nationale, in province of Quebec, in Canada.

Sautauriski Lake is located in Jacques-Cartier National Park.

The watershed area of Sautauriski Lake is mainly served on the east side by the route 175 which links the towns of Quebec and Saguenay. Few secondary roads served also this area for the needs of forestry and recreational tourism activities.

Forestry is the main economic activity in the sector; recreational tourism, second.

The surface of Lake Sautauriski is generally frozen from the beginning of December to the end of March; safe circulation on the ice is generally done from the end of December to the beginning of March.

Geography 
The Sautauriski dam is located at its mouth, at the bottom of a bay in the southern part of the lake.

Despite its small size, it is the largest of the 216 bodies of water in Jacques-Cartier National Park.

From the dam at the mouth of Lake Sautauriski, the current descends for  generally southward following the course of the Sautauriski River; then generally south on  along the current of the Jacques-Cartier river to the northeast shore of the St. Lawrence River.

Toponymy 
The toponym "Lac Sautauriski" was formalized on December 5, 1968, by the Commission de toponymie du Québec.

Notes and references

External links 
 Jacques-Cartier National Park

See also 
 Jacques-Cartier National Park
 La Côte-de-Beaupré Regional County Municipality
 Lac-Jacques-Cartier, an unorganized territory
 Sautauriski River
 Jacques-Cartier River
 List of lakes of Canada

Rivers of Capitale-Nationale
La Côte-de-Beaupré Regional County Municipality